Pettes is a surname. Notable people with the surname include:

Nathaniel Pettes (1816–1889), Canadian politician from Quebec
John Pettes (1793–1868), American businessman and civil servant

See also
Pettee
Petter (given name)
Pettis (surname)